The European Junior and U23 Canoe Slalom Championships is an annual international canoeing and kayaking event organized by the European Canoe Association (ECA). The Junior Championships were first held in 1995 and then every two years until 2003. The Under-23 Championships were first held in 2002 as part of the senior championships that year. Since 2004 the junior and U23 age categories are held annually together as part of the same event. Athletes under the age of 18 are eligible for the junior category.

Summary

Medal tables
As of the 2022 Championships.

Junior

Under 23

Junior and Under 23 (Total)

Junior Medalists

Canoe Single (C1) Boys

Canoe Double (C2) Boys

Kayak (K1) Boys

Extreme Kayak (K1) Boys

Canoe Single (C1) Girls

Kayak (K1) Girls

Extreme Kayak (K1) Girls

Canoe Single (C1) Boys Teams

Canoe Double (C2) Boys Teams

Kayak (K1) Boys Teams

Canoe Single (C1) Girls Teams

Kayak (K1) Girls Teams

Under 23 Medalists

Canoe Single (C1) Men

Canoe Double (C2) Men

Kayak (K1) Men

Extreme Kayak (K1) Men

Canoe Single (C1) Women

Kayak (K1) Women

Extreme Kayak (K1) Women

Canoe Double (C2) Mixed

Canoe Single (C1) Men Teams

Canoe Double (C2) Men Teams

Kayak (K1) Men Teams

Canoe Single (C1) Women Teams

Kayak (K1) Women Teams

See also
 European Canoe Slalom Championships
 ICF World Junior and U23 Canoe Slalom Championships
 ICF Canoe Slalom World Championships
 Canoe Slalom World Cup
 Canoeing and kayaking at the Summer Olympics
 Canoe slalom

References

External links
 European Canoe Association
U23 Championships results archive
Junior Championships results archive

 
Canoeing and kayaking competitions in Europe
Recurring sporting events established in 1995
Canoe slalom
Canoe slalom